Broome County Transit, popularly branded as B.C. Transit, is the public transportation system serving Broome County, New York, which includes the city of Binghamton and surrounding communities.

History
B.C. Transit was founded in 1968 when Broome County took over the assets of the private Triple Cities Traction Corporation, a takeover similar to those that took place in Rochester and Schenectady years prior. Unlike those city's transit systems, which became part of public benefit corporations, B.C. Transit is still owned and operated by the county (Department of Public Transportation) and is the largest such operator in Upstate New York (third largest overall in the state).

Broome Transit originally used a logo designed by renowned Swiss–Canadian designer Fritz Gottschalk. At a later date, it rebranded as "B.C. Transit" and adopted the character Thor from the comic strip B.C., drawn by Endicott, New York native Johnny Hart. The "B.C." is also based (very) loosely on one of the logos from that comic strip as well.

At the time of B.C. Transit's formation, they inherited the token stock of Triple Cities Traction  Corporation and that company's predecessor, the Binghamton Railway Company. These same tokens, some dating back to the turn of the 20th century, circulated until B.C. Transit phased out the token at the end of 2005 when they went to electronic fare collection.

Routes and services

City of Binghamton
3 Park Ave
5 Vestal Ave
7 Clinton St
8 Front St
9 BU Advantage
12 Conklin Ave
15 Leroy St
17 Johnson City
28 Robinson St

Other Triple Cities
35M Endicott (Binghamton to Endicott via Main St)
35W Endicott (Binghamton to Endicott via Watson Boulevard)
35x Express  (Binghamton to Endicott via Main St But bypasses Oakdale Mall)40 Chenango St47 Vestal-Endicott57 Shoppers SpecialRural51 Kirkwood Commuter53 Corporate Park55 Endwell Shuttle59 West Corners Shuttle15 Leroy turns into the 5 Vestal at the Junction.
17 Legacy Bay and 47 Vestal

Paratransit and other servicesB.C. Lift: Americans with Disabilities Act mandated service for those who are physically unable to ride regular fixed-route services and live within the B.C. Transit fixed-route area.OFA Mini-Bus: Similar to B.C. Lift, but intended for persons age 65 and over, physical disability is not required. Service paid for by Broome County Office for Aging and operated by BC Transit.B.C. Country': Dial-a-ride service for those who live in areas of Broome County not served by fixed-route transit service and meet certain other criteria.

Fleet

Current fleet

  (All buses are Wheelchair-accessible )''

2009 Orion Bus Industries 07.501 "Next Generation" Hybrid 101-105 (units pending retirement)

2011 Orion Bus Industries 07.501 EPA10 "Third Generation" Hybrid 601-606 (units pending retirement)

2014-2021 Gillig Corporation Gillig Low Floor 701-707, 721-727, 741-748, 761-767, 781-783

2018-2021 Gillig Corporation Gillig Low Floor Hybrid 621-623, 641-642

Future fleet

BC Transit has signed a contract to purchase 6 Novabus LFSe+ Battery Electric Buses, expected to be in service by 2024.

Past fleet
701-707     GMC     TDH-3502   1968  064-080
801-814(I)  GMC     T6H-4521   1968  114-127
101-106     GMC     T8W-603    1979  001-006
201-217     Grumman 40096-6-T  1982  CD094396-CD094412
601-617     Orion   01.508     1987  H6001587-H6001603
900-902     Orion   01.508     1992  N6003097-N6003099
501-515     Orion   05.501     1996  T6032639-T6032653
720         Orion   01.508    [1997] G6001400           Ex-NFTA 720 (built 1986)
729         Orion   01.508    [1997] G6001411           Ex-NFTA 729 (built 1986)
741         Orion   01.508    [1997] G6001426           Ex-NFTA 741 (built 1986)
757         Orion   01.508    [1997] G6001445           Ex-NFTA 757 (built 1986)
801-814(II) Orion   06.501     2000  Y6600213-Y6000237
815-823     Orion   06.501     2000  Y6600213-Y6000237

References

External links
 B.C. Transit Homepage
 B.C. Transit roster as of 2002
 Broome County Transit Orders Six Hybrid Electric Buses

Bus transportation in New York (state)
Binghamton, New York
Transportation in Broome County, New York
Companies based in Binghamton, New York
Paratransit services in the United States